The  is a diesel multiple unit (DMU) tilting train type operated by the third-sector operating company Chizu Express and West Japan Railway Company (JR West) on Super Hakuto limited express services between , , and  in Japan since December 1994.

The designation "HOT" is derived from the initials of the three prefectures along the route served: Hyogo Prefecture, Okayama Prefecture, and Tottori Prefecture.

Formation
Trains are normally formed as five-car sets, sometimes lengthened to six cars.

History
The first trains entered service on 3 December 1994.

Smoking compartments were added to cars 1 and 5 from 1 June 2008.

References

External links

 Chizu Express Super Hakuto 

Diesel multiple units of Japan
Chizu Express
Train-related introductions in 1994
Tilting trains
Fuji rolling stock